Gurab Sar (also Romanized as Gūrāb Sar and Goorab Sar; also known as Bāzār-e Gūrābsar) is a village in Belesbeneh Rural District, Kuchesfahan District, Rasht County, Gilan Province, Iran. At the 2006 census, its population was 1,058, in 291 families.

References 

Populated places in Rasht County